Rhododendron atlanticum, the dwarf azalea or coastal azalea, is a species of Rhododendron native to coastal areas of the eastern United States, from New Jersey south to Georgia.

The leaves are 3–5 cm long and 1–2 cm broad, bluish green, and hairless or with scattered glandular hairs. The fragrant flowers are 3–4 cm long, usually white to pink, sometimes with a flush of yellow; they are produced in trusses of 4-10 together.

It is a very tough subject, responding to overgrazing or forest fires by throwing up new shoots the following year.

References

atlanticum
Flora of the Northeastern United States
Flora of the Southeastern United States
Flora without expected TNC conservation status